Gillian Furniss (born 14 March 1957) is a British politician serving as Member of Parliament (MP) for Sheffield Brightside and Hillsborough since 2016. A member of the Labour Party, she has been Shadow Minister for Roads since 2022.

Early life and education 
Furniss was born in Sheffield on 14 March 1957. She is the daughter of a Sheffield steel worker. She was educated at the Chaucer School, Sheffield, and graduated from Leeds Metropolitan University with a BA in Library and Information Studies as a mature student in 1998. After leaving school, she worked as a librarian and went on to work as an administrator at the Northern General Hospital.

Political career

Local government
Furniss unsuccessfully stood as the Labour Party candidate in the Hillsborough Ward in 1998. She was subsequently elected in the Manor ward in 1999 and re-elected in 2003. With the introduction of new ward boundaries for the 2004 Sheffield City Council election, she was elected to represent Southey ward. She was re-elected in 2006, 2010 and 2014 before standing down in 2016 upon her election as an MP.

Parliamentary career
Furniss stood unsuccessfully as the Labour Party candidate for Sheffield Hallam in the 2001 General Election, finishing in third place.

She is the widow of Harry Harpham, former MP for Sheffield Brightside and Hillsborough, who employed her as a part-time researcher following his election in the 2015 General Election.

Following her husband's death in February 2016, she was selected as the Labour candidate at the Sheffield Brightside and Hillsborough by-election which was held on 5 May 2016. She won the by-election with an increased share of the vote and a majority of 9,590 (42.5%) over the second-placed candidate representing UKIP. She was re-elected at the 2017 and the 2019 general elections.

In Parliament, Furniss has served on the Women and Equalities Committee.

Frontbench positions 
Furniss was appointed Parliamentary Private Secretary to the Shadow Energy and Climate Change Secretary, Lisa Nandy, in May 2016. The position was last held by her late husband, Harry Harpham, and she continued to serve in the role after Nandy resigned and was succeeded by Barry Gardiner.

In the October 2016 opposition front bench reshuffle, Furniss was appointed to the new position of Shadow Minister for Steel, Postal Affairs and Consumer Protection. Following the election of Keir Starmer as Labour leader in April 2020, she became Shadow Minister for Women and Equalities. She moved to become an Opposition Whip in July 2020, and served in the role until her appointment as Shadow Roads Minister in January 2022. Her shadow transport brief covers green transport, transport decarbonisation, future transport and roads.

Electoral performance

Policies and views

Labour Leadership Elections
As a councillor, in 2015 Furniss endorsed Andy Burnham in the Labour leadership contest

As an MP, in 2016 Furniss reportedly voted against a motion of no confidence by the Parliamentary Labour Party in the leadership of Jeremy Corbyn.
 She did not make a nomination in the subsequent leadership election. In 2020 Furniss formally nominated Lisa Nandy and Angela Rayner in the leadership election and deputy leadership election

Notes

References

External links
Gill Furniss MP official constituency website

1957 births
Alumni of Leeds Beckett University
Councillors in Sheffield
Female members of the Parliament of the United Kingdom for English constituencies
Labour Party (UK) MPs for English constituencies
Living people
UK MPs 2015–2017
21st-century British women politicians
UK MPs 2017–2019
UK MPs 2019–present
21st-century English women
21st-century English people
Women councillors in England